Fumarranol is a drug which acts as an inhibitor of the type 2 methionine aminopeptidase enzyme METAP2. It was derived by structural modification of the natural product fumagillin. It was originally developed as an anti-angiogenesis drug for the treatment of cancer, but it was subsequently found to bind with high affinity to the METAP2 enzyme in malaria parasites and has been investigated as a potential treatment for malaria.

See also 
 Beloranib

References 

Enzyme inhibitors